The ninth edition of Dwars door Vlaanderen's women's race was held on Wednesday 31 April 2021. The race started and finished in Waregem, and it was won by Annemiek van Vleuten ahead of Katarzyna Niewiadoma in a sprint of two. Alexis Ryan won the bunch sprint for third place.

Teams
Eight UCI Women's WorldTeams and twenty UCI Women's Continental Teams competed in the race. Most teams started with 6 riders, making for a total of 164 riders of which there were 108 finishers within the time limit and two non-starters.

UCI Women's WorldTeams

 
 
 
 
 
 
 
 

UCI Women's Continental Teams

Results

See also
 2021 in women's road cycling

References

Women's cycle racing
Dwars door Vlaanderen for Women
March 2021 sports events in Belgium